Charles Howard Olmstead (March 14, 1905 – ) was an American football guard.  A native of Louisville, Kentucky, he played professional football as a guard for the Louisville Brecks in the National Football League (NFL). He appeared in six NFL games during the 1922 and 1923 seasons.

References

1905 births
Louisville Brecks players
Players of American football from Louisville, Kentucky
Year of death missing